The 2000 Three Days of De Panne was the 24th edition of the Three Days of De Panne cycle race and was held on 28 March to 30 March 2000. The race started in Mouscron and finished in De Panne. The race was won by Viatcheslav Ekimov.

General classification

References

Three Days of Bruges–De Panne
2000 in Belgian sport